The Cape York mosaic-tailed rat, or Cape York melomys (Melomys capensis) is a species of rodent in the family Muridae.
It is found only in Australia, on the Cape York Peninsula.

References

Melomys
Mammals of Queensland
Mammals described in 1951
Taxonomy articles created by Polbot
Taxa named by George Henry Hamilton Tate